Francis Anthony Ward (23 February 1906 – 25 March 1974) was an Australian cricketer who played in four Test matches from 1936 to 1938. On his debut, he took six wickets in the second innings against England at Brisbane in 1936.

References

1906 births
1974 deaths
Australia Test cricketers
South Australia cricketers
Australian cricketers
Cricketers who have taken five wickets on Test debut
D. G. Bradman's XI cricketers